Buckley LLP is a financial services, criminal, and civil enforcement defense law firm with 160 lawyers in Washington, D.C., New York, San Francisco, Los Angeles, Chicago, and London. The firm was founded in 2009 with 40 lawyers and its largest office is still located in Washington D.C. Buckley lawyers practice in a range of areas including banking and finance law, commercial litigation, corporate compliance and governance, financial services regulation, digital commerce, privacy and data security, and white collar criminal defense. The firm's current and former clients include 21 of the US's 25 largest banks, the Navajo Nation, and senior executives at Google.

Details 
Buckley has offices in Washington DC, Los Angeles, San Francisco, New York, Chicago, and London. As of December 31, 2019, Buckley has 124 attorneys in its United States offices. Buckley is one of the largest and most experienced groups of financial services attorneys in the United States.

Honors
In 2014, Buckley was named as a Consumer Protection Practice Group of the Year by Law360. In U.S. News & World Report's Best Law Firms, Buckley is currently ranked as a National Tier 1 law firm for (i) Litigation - Banking & Finance and (ii) Financial Services Regulation Law, and ranked as a National Tier 2 law firm for Banking and Finance Law. Buckley was also recognized by Chambers USA 2018 for achieving the following practice rankings: Band 1 – Nationwide – Financial Services Regulation: Consumer Finance (Compliance & Litigation); Band 2 – Nationwide –  Financial Services Regulation: Banking (Enforcement & Investigations); Band 3 – District of Columbia – Litigation: White-Collar Crime & Government Investigations.

References

Law firms based in Washington, D.C.
Law firms established in 2009
2009 establishments in Washington, D.C.